Lei Uk Tsuen, sometimes transliterated as Lee Uk, is a village in Tai Wai, Sha Tin District, Hong Kong.

Location
Lei Uk Tsuen is located east of Che Kung Temple and west of Chun Shek Estate.

Administration
Lei Uk Tsuen is a recognized village under the New Territories Small House Policy.

History
Lei Uk Tsuen was established by the Lei clan in the late 17th century.

See also
 Sha Tin Tau

References

External links

 Delineation of area of existing village Sha Tin Tau and Lee Uk (Sha Tin) for election of resident representative (2019 to 2022)

Villages in Sha Tin District, Hong Kong
Tai Wai